Triple Threat is a 1948 American drama sport film directed by Jean Yarbrough, produced by Sam Katzman, and starring Gloria Henry.

Plot
College rivals Don Whitney and Joe Nolan clash in the Rose Bowl football game in Pasadena, California, with Don's team victorious. Joe decides to give up football and go to medical school instead, disappointing girlfriend Marian Rutherford, who was hoping Joe would become a rich and famous football hero instead.

Joe does change his mind, joining the Los Angeles Rams, which Joe's mother finds out by watching the Rams' game versus the Green Bay Packers on a television that Whitney has given to Joe's sister Ruth as a gift.

Deliberately injured by Don in a pro football game, Joe is pleased at first when Don is banned from playing in an all-star game. But with the game in progress, Joe has a change of heart and fakes an injury, whereupon Don is permitted to enter the game in his place and score the winning touchdown.

Cast
 Gloria Henry as Ruth Nolan
 Richard Crane as Don Whitney
 Mary Stuart as Marian Rutherford
 Pat Phelan as Joe Nolan
 John Litel as Coach Snyder
 Sammy Baugh as himself
 Paul Christman as himself
 Johnny Clement as himself
 Boley Dancewicz as himself
 Bill Dudley as himself
 Paul Governali as himself
 Jack Jacobs as himself
 Sid Luckman as himself
 Charley Trippi as himself
 Steve Van Buren as himself
 Bob Waterfield as himself
 Harry Wismer as himself
 Tom Harmon as himself
 Bob Kelley as himself

Production
Henry's casting was announced in July 1948.

A number of football players of the era make cameo appearances, including Sammy Baugh, Paul Christman, Sid Luckman, Charley Trippi, Steve Van Buren and Bob Waterfield.

References

External links
Triple Threat at TCMDB
Triple Threat at IMDb

1948 films
American football films
Columbia Pictures films
American black-and-white films
1940s sports films
Films directed by Jean Yarbrough
1940s American films
1940s English-language films